Kappa Mikey is an American animated television series created by Larry Schwarz. The show was created by Schwarz's studio Animation Collective. The series premiered on February 25, 2006 and ended on September 20, 2008. 52 episodes were produced.

The show was first picked up in 2002, when it was announced that Noggin's teen block The N would be co-developing and airing the series. Animation World Network reported that Noggin/The N had signed on as a co-producer. However, the show was moved to Nicktoons Network, a sister channel to Noggin. With the move, it became the first half-hour series to premiere exclusively on Nicktoons.

Plot
The series is a parody of Japanese anime, featuring a young American actor named Mikey whose appearance is styled after Western cartoons, and travels to Japan to star in a tokusatsu show called LillyMu, where his anime-influenced co-stars represent common anime clichés.

Each episode follows a specific formula. A typical episode starts with the cast filming a LilyMu segment, but the take is ruined, sometimes revealing the conflict that the characters deal with through the rest of the episode, with a minor subplot running beneath the main plot. After the problem is resolved, the LilyMu segment will be shot again and successfully completed the second time, often rewritten to incorporate whatever lesson was learned during the main story.

Deep into season 2, Kappa Mikey has stopped showing a LilyMu sequence at the end of an episode whenever it would make the episode too long, when the characters are in their LilyMu uniforms enough as it is, or when they successfully film a sequence without any mistakes before the ending.

Production
The show's title is a play on the word kappamaki, a type of sushi. It is suggested that the show was the inspiration for naming the title character "Mikey" and used the prefix "kappa". Like Mikey, who is a "fish out of water" in Japan, the kappa itself is a water demon creature who can live on land. The kappas first appeared on this show in the episode "Mikey, Kappa" on August 5, 2007, where the origin of the title was explained. Coincidentally, Mikey also shares his name with the actor who supplies his voice.

Unlike other cartoons produced at the turn of the 21st century, the property was owned by the studio instead of an agency, the animation was not outsourced and the episodes were written by full-time staff. After producing Internet-based projects and television spots, the series became Animation Collective's first television series. The series was produced in New York City; pre-production began in 2002 and animation started in the summer of 2005. Production for the two seasons wrapped in September 2007.

Schwarz conceived the series in 2000, when he was working at Rumpus Toys, a toy design company in New York City, but they folded before any storyboarding could commence. They resurfaced years later as Animation Collective, and produced an early test pilot for a pitch to MTV Networks, where the character designs and backgrounds were closer to those found in Adult Swim series Perfect Hair Forever, and the humor was also more adult-oriented. Much of the current cast was voicing their characters even this early in production.

In September 2001, Sunbow Entertainment signed a co-production deal with Rumpus Toys to produce the series. Sunbow's parent company TV-Loonland AG would hold worldwide and home video distribution rights. In May 2002, the project was picked up by Noggin for its teen-oriented programming block The N. Noggin/The N signed a co-development deal for the series, while Animation Collective retained the series' copyright and took over distribution rights from TV-Loonland. The show was retooled to appeal to a slightly younger demographic than MTV's main 18-34 year old audience. For unknown reasons, Sunbow later pulled out of the deal, and by the time animation was completed, The N had shifted more to live-action shows, and Kappa Mikey was moved to the younger-skewing Nicktoons Network, where the series was tweaked even further in order to be aimed at younger children. Voice talents were usually local, and its audio was recorded at Manhattan-based NYAV Post, which Michael Sinterniklaas owns. Larry Schwarz, along with the other executive producers, oversaw all phases of production, but only had writing credits on the pilot episode, "Mikey Impossible" and "A Christmas Mikey". All the episodes were directed by Sergei Aniskov. The instrumental score was composed by John Angier, who also wrote the lyrics to "The Recycling Song", "Ori and Yori's Hits", "Living With Mikey", "How Did We Get Here?" and the songs from "The Karaoke Episode".

The series was animated in Adobe Flash, with some moments of CGI rendered in Maya. To further emphasize the contrast in animation styles, one group of animators was assigned to the anime characters, and another group was in charge of Mikey and the other American characters. The vehicles on LilyMu and around Tokyo, as well as the weapons, the Gonard balloon, Pirate King's ship, the Karaoke Genie Machine, etc., were created in Maya and exported into Flash using the Toon Filter. The backgrounds were modeled in Maya, and texture, details, and clouds were added in Photoshop. Some of the backgrounds were inspired by actual locations in Tokyo. The show's anime-style characters perform with large comedic overuses of face faults, such as a face and/or body turning into an exaggerated general appearance, or becoming much smaller. This allowed animators to have more control over how a character looks and acts than on many other Flash shows, and they did not always have to be on-model. The show uses clichés common to anime, including the sweat drop, lines over the eyes or no eyes at all, big heads, flaming eyes, and bodies becoming smaller. Sometimes Mikey will try to do these things, which was one of the show's running gags, but cannot due to being drawn in an American style.

Characters

 Mikey Simon (voiced by Michael Sinterniklaas)
 Gonard (voiced by Sean Schemmel)
 Guano (voiced by Gary Mack)
 Lily (voiced by Kether Donohue)
 Mitsuki (voiced by Carrie Keranen)
 Ozu (voiced by Stephen Moverly)
 Yes Man (voiced by Jesse Adams)

Episodes

Series overview

Season 1 (2006–07)

Season 2 (2007–08)

Dancing Sushi

Dancing Sushi is a spin-off series based on the brief bumpers within the series. The series features four sushi characters - Salmon, Larry, Roro, and Meep - who all want to become the world's biggest pop stars. Unlike the main series, Dancing Sushi lacks any dialogue. The sushi were "voiced" by individuals involved in the original Kappa Mikey series including from John Angier, the composer of the series, and director John Holt.

Dancing Sushi was produced from October 2007 to December 2007. It was intended as a way to continue offering fans of Kappa Mikey more of the same kinds of characters in the same universe, and also to keep animators working on the transition between the studio's two major shows; Speed Racer: The Next Generation was in production soon afterward. At one point, there was consideration to reprise some of the Kappa Mikey characters into this series as well.

Home media
A Kappa Mikey DVD was released on September 18, 2007 under the Starz Home Entertainment brand, and includes the episodes "Lost in Transportation", "Easy Come, Easy Gonard", and "The Man Who Would Be Mikey", all from the first season, as well as bonus material, including a fictional music video of "I'm Alright" taken from the episode "Battle of the Bands", wallpaper, an interactive game parodying Hollywood Squares, and a How-to-Draw-Mikey tutorial.

In 2008, the Animation Collective site advertised a second DVD that was scheduled be released sometime later that year.  However, the announcement was removed from the website, leaving the exact release date to be unknown. The DVD was intended to include the first season in its entirety, with DVD extras, and would have been considered more of an "official" volume than the last one. No further announcement has been made as the status of this DVD. As of 2009, this release is shelved.

Season 1 (Episodes 1–13) was released on DVD on September 12, 2007 , and Season 2 (Episodes 14–26) was released on DVD on March 12, 2008  by Anchor Bay Entertainment in Australia.

The soundtrack for "The Karaoke Episode" is available as a downloadable album on iTunes. Both seasons of the show itself were also available for download from iTunes before they were later taken down from the online retailer.

Footnotes

References

External links

 

 
2000s American animated television series
2000s American satirical television series
2006 American television series debuts
2008 American television series endings
American children's animated action television series
American children's animated adventure television series
American children's animated comedy television series
American children's animated fantasy television series
American children's animated superhero television series
American flash animated television series
Anime-influenced Western animated television series
English-language television shows
Japan in non-Japanese culture
Nicktoons (TV network) original programming
Satire anime and manga
Teen animated television series
Teen superhero television series
Television shows set in Tokyo
Works by Len Wein